Song Hye-kyo (born November 22, 1981) is a South Korean actress. She gained international popularity through her leading roles in the television dramas Autumn in My Heart (2000), All In (2003), Full House (2004), That Winter, the Wind Blows (2013), Descendants of the Sun (2016), Encounter (2018) and The Glory (2022). Her film work includes Hwang Jin Yi (2007), The Grandmaster (2013), My Brilliant Life (2014), and The Queens (2015).

In 2017, Song Hye-kyo ranked 7th in Forbes magazine's Korea Power Celebrity list, and 6th in 2018. She is referred to as one of "The Troika," along with Kim Tae-hee and Jun Ji-hyun, collectively known by the blend word "Tae-Hye-Ji".
The success of Song's television dramas internationally established her as a top Hallyu star.

Early life and education
When Song was born, she was so ill that her parents and doctors thought that she would not survive. Upon her recovery, Song's parents registered her birth on February 26, 1982 (instead of her actual birthdate, November 22, 1981).

Song's parents divorced when she was a young girl, after which she was raised by her mother. They moved from her birthplace in Daegu to the Gangnam District in Seoul, where she trained as a figure skater in elementary school but quit when she was in the eighth grade.  Song considered herself shy and introverted, but when she attended Ewha Girls' High School she was described by her high school teacher as having a "cheerful character, she mixed well with her friends and was always in a bright mood." Song Hye-kyo attended Sejong University, where she majored in Film Arts.

Career

1996–2004: Debut, breakthrough, and international fame
In 1996, the fourteen-year-old Song, then a third-year junior high school student, won first place in the SunKyung Smart Model Contest, and made her entertainment debut as a model for the school uniform company. This led to her being cast in a small role in her first television drama, First Love. She would continue to appear in a string of dramas and sitcoms, most notably Soonpoong Clinic. But it was not until the KBS drama Autumn in My Heart in 2000 with Song Seung-heon and Won Bin that she rose to fame in Korea and throughout Asia. The romantic melodrama series was a ratings success, pioneering a trend in Korean melodramatic series and launching a trend that is commonly referred to as the "Korean Wave" and leading to Song becoming a Hallyu star.

In 2003, her popularity continued to climb as she played a leading role alongside Lee Byung-hun in the gambling drama All In, which drew solid viewership ratings nationwide throughout its run with a peak viewer rating of 47.7 percent. The following year, she co-starred with singer Rain in the hit romantic comedy series Full House. The drama achieved pan-Asian success and established Song as one of the best-known Korean actresses in Asia.

2005–2012: Film debut and overseas ventures
Early 2005, Song went to San Francisco to study English, and later traveled to Seattle. She took time off to recharge herself after the successful Asia drama Full House. "I have had a good rest. It was a good opportunity to reflect on myself," said Song. Song returned to Korea on March 5, 2005. The same year, Song made her big-screen debut in My Girl and I (a Korean remake of Crying Out Love in the Center of the World), which was panned by audiences and critics alike. Vocal about her dissatisfaction with typecasting in the roles she was being offered, Song proved in the following year that she could play different roles.

She returned to the big screen in 2007 as the titular gisaeng in the film adaptation of Hwang Jin Yi. Because they found Song's image "too cute," Jun Ji-hyun and Soo Ae were the producers' original choices for the role, but Song went on a rigorous diet and surprised them with her will and desire to be Hwang Jini. A year later, she made her American debut in the Hollywood indie Make Yourself at Home (formerly titled Fetish), a psychological thriller about a girl who was born to a shaman mother and tries to flee her fate by becoming an immigrant bride in the US. Despite Song's attempts to challenge herself, both films underwhelmed the box office.

She made her TV comeback in late 2008 with The World That They Live In (also known as Worlds Within), a series set at a broadcast station in which Song and Hyun Bin played drama PDs who work together and fall in love.

In 2010, she starred in Camellia, an omnibus film made up of three short films directed by three Asian directors. Each episode is set in the past, present, and future of the city of Busan. In the film's final segment, Love for Sale, Song and Kang Dong-won played former lovers who forget their memories about each other, which later leads them to a fatal destiny.

Considered one of Korea's most beautiful women, in early 2011 Song released the photo-book Song Hye-kyo's Moment, which was shot by top photographers in Atlanta, New York City, Buenos Aires, Patagonia, Paris, the Netherlands and Brazil. Proceeds from the sales of the photo book was donated to a children's foundation.

Song next played a documentary filmmaker who finds the strength to forgive the seventeen-year-old boy who killed her fiancé but instead of redemption finds only greater tragedy in A Reason to Live (Korean title: Today), which after several delays was released in October 2011. Song was a huge fan of director Lee Jeong-hyang and had actively sought her out, and though she had difficulty getting into character, Song said she fell in love with the script and felt her acting had matured. She considers the film "a turning point" in her life.

In 2011, she became the first Asian actress to sign a contract with French global agency Effigies, paving the way for her possible entry into the European market. She released a photo-essay book in 2012 titled It's Time for Hye-kyo.

Song next played a supporting role in The Grandmaster, Chinese director Wong Kar-wai's biographical film about Bruce Lee's kung fu master Ip Man, for which she learned Cantonese and martial arts. She later admitted there had been "a bit of friction and misunderstanding" with Wong while filming, but that the difficulties helped her mature.

2013–present: Career resurgence
Song reunited with the writer and director of Worlds Within in That Winter, the Wind Blows, a 2013 remake of 2002 Japanese drama Ai Nante Irane Yo, Natsu ("I Don't Need Love, Summer"). She played a blind heiress in the melodrama, opposite a con man pretending to be her long-lost brother (played by Jo In-sung). That Winter, the Wind Blows placed number one in its time slot during most of its run, and Song and Jo were praised for their performances. Song won the Daesang (or "Grand Prize"), the highest award for television, at the 2nd APAN Star Awards.

In 2014, Song reunited with Kang Dong-won in My Brilliant Life, E J-yong's film adaptation of Kim Aeran's bestselling novel My Palpitating Life about a couple who watched their son suffering from progeria grow prematurely old.

The romantic epic The Crossing was Song's second Chinese film to be released. It was directed by John Woo (Woo's longtime friend and producer Terence Chang has been managing Song's overseas activities since 2008). Previously titled 1949 and Love and Let Love, the long-gestating project had originally been announced at the Cannes Film Festival in 2008, then cancelled in 2009, and revived again in 2011. Woo's recovery from tonsil tumor removal in 2012 led to another delay due to scheduling conflicts among the cast, and Song finally began filming in June 2013. The Crossing is based on the true story of the Taiping steamer collision. It follows six characters' intertwining love stories in Taiwan and Shanghai during the 1930s. Song played the daughter of a wealthy banker.

Another Chinese film followed in 2015, The Queens, a contemporary romantic comedy about three cosmopolitan women – an actress, a PR specialist, and a gallery manager – who manipulate friends and put down their enemies as they play the game of love. Also starring Joe Chen and Vivian Wu, it was actress Annie Yi's directorial debut.

In 2016, Song starred in the mega-hit romantic comedy series Descendants of the Sun, an intense drama about an army captain (played by Song Joong-ki) and a surgeon who fall in love while working in disaster-torn areas. The drama was incredibly popular in Korea with a peak viewership rating of 41.6% and in Asia, where it was viewed 2.5 billion times on iQiyi. The popularity of the drama reestablished Song as a leader of the Hallyu. She topped popularity polls in Asia and was noted for her immense brand recognition in South Korea. Song won Daesang (Grand Prize), the highest award at the 2016 KBS Drama Awards along with her co-star, Song Joong-ki.

After a two-year hiatus, she returned in the small screen with romantic-melodrama Encounter alongside Park Bo-gum. In 2021, Song starred in SBS romantic drama Now, We Are Breaking Up, playing a team leader of design department of a fashion company.

In 2022, Song reunited with Descendants of the Sun writer Kim Eun-sook in the Netflix series The Glory. The series was well received by the audience and Song's portrayal of Moon Dong-eun, a victim of brutal high school bullying who dedicates her adulthood to plot revenge against perpetrators, was met with praise by the critics.

Personal life

Marriage 

On July 5, 2017, Song and Descendants of the Sun co-star Song Joong-ki announced through their respective agencies that they were engaged.  They married in a private ceremony on October 31, 2017, at Youngbingwan, Hotel Shilla in Seoul, amid intense media interest across Asia. The ceremony was attended by the couple's closest family and friends, including actors Lee Kwang-soo, Yoo Ah-in, and Park Bo-gum, who also played the piano at the reception.

On June 27, 2019, Song Joong-ki revealed that he had filed for divorce with Song Hye-kyo the previous day. The divorce was finalised in July 2019.

On July 25, 2019, Song Hye-kyo filed a complaint against fifteen online netizens for “spread of false information, defamation of character and insult.”

Legal
In August 2014, following inadvertent exposure by a politician overseeing the administration of the National Tax Service of South Korea, Song made a public apology for committing tax evasion when she claimed undocumented expenses. In response to allegations that she had underpaid income tax from 2009 to 2011 totaling , she argued that her accountant had mishandled her paperwork without her knowledge. Song was again billed another  in April 2014 against her 2008 tax filing, a result of the legally required five-year audit neglected since the 2012 notification.

Philanthropy
Song actively participates in voluntary work, especially with animals. She participates in activities related by KARA regularly.

Song is also known for her frequent large charitable donations.

Collaboration with Professor Seo Kyung-duk
A representative from Song's agency said, "Because Song has travelled extensively for work, she has become aware of how important it is for tourists to be able to read information in their own language." Song, in collaboration with professor Seo Kyung-duk of Sungshin Women's University, donated brochures of information in Korean to various historic Korean sites, art galleries, and museums in the world. Professor Seo praised Song for supporting her country quietly.

 In January 2012, Song and Seo funded publication of a new MoMA Korean guidebook in New York City. "Song covered the cost of publishing a new Korean guidebook for MoMA," said Seo.
 In April 2012, Song covered the cost for the production of the new Korean brochure for Yun Bong-gil Memorial Hall in Shanghai, China.
 In October 2012, Song funded the creation of an application for smartphone users to provide information on museums associated with Korea overseas. It was launched to mark Hangeul (Korean alphabet) Day.
 In November 2012, Song and Seo installed a promotional video box about Korea at the Museum of Fine Arts in Boston. 
 Song is acutely aware of the challenges faced by the visually impaired when she played a blind person in That Winter, the Wind Blows. In March 2013, she sponsored the publication of guidebooks for the blind at the Independence Hall of Korea in Cheonan.
 In August 2013, Song and Korea PR expert Seo Kyung-duk donated a relief work of three independence fighters to the Yi Jun Peace Museum in The Hague, Netherlands.
 In October 2013, Song and Korea PR specialist Seo Kyung-duk donated guidebooks in Korean at An Jung-geun Memorial Hall in Harbin, China.
 In November 2013, Korea PR specialist Seo Kyung-duk and the fan club of Song Hye-kyo announced that they had donated Korean guidebooks to National History Museum in Uzbekistan.
 In April 2014, Song and Seo donated 10,000 Korean information pamphlets for the building of the now-defunct Provisional Government of Korea in Hangzhou, China.
 In April 2015, Song donated money to print brochures at a church in New York City, which has been deemed as a historic Korean site.
 In April 2016, Song and Seo donated 10,000 Korean language brochures to the historic site of the Korean Provisional Government in Changsha. She has donated Korean language brochures to the Statue of Liberty in New York City too.
 In August 2016, to commemorate the National Liberation Day of Korea on August 15, Song and professor Seo donated a total of 10,000 brochures to the Utoro Village in Japan.
 In December 2016, Song and Professor Seo donated 10,000 copies of a Korean guidebook to Yun Bong-gil Memorial Hall in Shanghai for commemoration of his passing day (December 19, 1932).
 In March 2017, Song celebrated the Independence Movement Day by donating 10,000 copies of a Korean guidebook to historic Korean sites in Tokyo.
 In May 2017, Song and Seo supplied Korean guidebooks to the Royal Ontario Museum in Toronto.
 In August 2017, Song and Seo donated guidebooks about the Korean historical sites located in Kyoto. 
 In August 2019, Song and Seo donated information guide leaflets to the Provisional Government of the Republic of Korea in Chongqing, China, on Thursday to celebrate Korea's National Liberation Day. 
 In October 2020, Song and Seo donated 10,000 copies of the guide on 'Our History Met Overseas - Paris Edition' to the Korean Cultural Center in France.
 On March 1, 2022, Song and Seo donated 10,000 copies of the 'Story of Our History Overseas-San Francisco Edition' to the Korean Education Center in San Francisco.
On August 15, 2022, Song donated Kim Gyu-sik's relief work to the Temporary Government Center in Chongqing, China on the occasion of the 77th anniversary of Independence Day. 
 In October 2022, Song and Sungshin Women's University professor Seo Kyung-deok donated 10,000 copies of Korean guidebooks to the Utoro Peace Memorial located in Uji, Japan on Hangeul Day.
 On December 23, 2022, Song and Seo donated 10,000 Korean handbooks to the Korean Embassy in Washington, D.C., USA.

Other donations
In October 2013, Song donated 1,000 tickets to the Busan International Film Festival for the underprivileged young people in the Busan area. In July 2014, Song purchased 800 tickets for The Seoul International Women's Film Festival  and donated them to the Korean Psychological Association and the Magdalena Community.

In December 2016, Song made a donation to the Beautiful Foundation, to be used for educational support projects for low-income students who dream of becoming design experts. In July 2017, Song donated 100 million won to Seoul National University Children's Hospital.

In March 2022, Song donated 100 million won to Korean Red Cross to the help the victims of the massive wildfire that started in Uljin, Gyeongbuk and has spread to Samcheok, Gangwon.

Filmography

Film

Television series

Web series

Television shows

Music video appearances

Discography

Singles

Books

Awards and nominations

State honors

Listicles

Notes

References

External links 

  
 

1981 births
IHQ (company) artists
Living people
People from Daegu
Sejong University alumni
South Korean child actresses
South Korean female models
South Korean film actresses
South Korean television actresses
Yeosan Song clan
21st-century South Korean actresses